The canton of Crépy-en-Valois is an administrative division of the Oise department, northern France. Its borders were modified at the French canton reorganisation which came into effect in March 2015. Its seat is in Crépy-en-Valois.

It consists of the following communes:
 
Auger-Saint-Vincent
Béthancourt-en-Valois
Béthisy-Saint-Martin
Béthisy-Saint-Pierre
Bonneuil-en-Valois
Crépy-en-Valois
Duvy
Éméville
Feigneux
Fresnoy-la-Rivière
Gilocourt
Glaignes
Morienval
Néry
Orrouy
Rocquemont
Russy-Bémont
Saintines
Saint-Vaast-de-Longmont
Séry-Magneval
Trumilly
Vauciennes
Vaumoise
Verberie
Vez

References

Cantons of Oise